God Bless the Renegades is the first full-length solo album by Sevendust's guitarist Clint Lowery. The album was recorded and mixed at Studio Barbarosa in Gotha, Florida, produced by Michael "Elvis" Baskette. It was released under label Rise on January 31, 2020.

Track listing

Personnel
Clint Lowery – lead vocals, guitars, bass guitar, drums
Wolfgang Van Halen – additional drums
Michael "Elvis" Baskette – production, mixing, co-writing

See also
List of 2020 albums

References

2020 debut albums
Rise Records albums
Albums produced by Michael Baskette